Mărăcineanu is a Romanian-language surname that may refer to:

Roxana Mărăcineanu, French politician, swimmer, and TV consultant
Ștefania Mărăcineanu, Romanian physicist
Valter Mărăcineanu, Romanian soldier

Romanian-language surnames